Dalu Legislative Assembly constituency is one of the 60 Legislative Assembly constituencies of Meghalaya state in India.

It is part of West Garo Hills district and is reserved for candidates belonging to the Scheduled Tribes.

Members of the Legislative Assembly

Election results

2018

See also
 List of constituencies of the Meghalaya Legislative Assembly
 West Garo Hills district

References

West Garo Hills district
Assembly constituencies of Meghalaya